Clytoleptus albofasciatus is a species of beetle in the family Cerambycidae, the only species in the genus Clytoleptus.

References

Clytini
Monotypic Cerambycidae genera